Sara Misir (born January 29, 1998) is a Jamaican race car driver. She competes as part of the Formula Woman Team for McLaren Customer Racing in the GT Cup Championships in the United Kingdom. She is the Caribbean's first Formula Woman race car driver.

Early life 
Misir was born at Nuttall Hospital in St. Andrew, Jamaica. She first represented Jamaica as a junior equestrian. In preparation for the Pan American Games at 16 years old, Misir suffered an accident where she fell from her horse and her skull and jaw were fractured. She needed a 6-month recovery to return to equestrian sport. She then switched to motor racing at the age of 18 years old. Misir has achieved podium finishes in both Jamaica & the US.

Racing career 
Misir made her international motorsport career debut on June 8, 2022, competing in the GT Cup Championships at the Snetterton Circuit in the UK. She also competed in the fourth stop of GT Cup Championship at Oulton Park in Rounds 13 & 14 on July 9 and Silverstone on July 30 and 31. She finished 7th at Snetterton race track in the GT Cup June 11 & 12. She finished 8th at Oultan Park on Jul 9 and was fifth at the Silverstone Circuit on July 30.

In Jamaica Racing, Sara won a hat-trick of races in three consecutive JRDC meets at the Dover Raceway to emerged the 2022 Champion in both the JRDC Modified Production 3  and the TS1 Classes.

References 

1998 births
Living people

Jamaican racing drivers